Olympia is an urban unincorporated area and census-designated place (CDP) in Richland County, South Carolina, United States. It was first listed as a CDP prior to the 2020 census with a population of 1,087.

The CDP is in western Richland County, bordered to the north by the city of Columbia, the state capital, and to the west, across the Congaree River, by the city of Cayce. The eastern half of the CDP is residential, while the western half is occupied by the Columbia Quarry of Vulcan Materials.

Four locations in the CDP are listed on the National Register of Historic Places. The Olympia Armory is on Granby Lane in the northeast part of the CDP, the Olympia Mill School is on Olympia Avenue in the northern part of the CDP, and the Olympia Union Hall is on Silver Street in the northernmost part of the CDP, close to the Columbia city line. Much of the northeast part of the CDP is within the Olympia Mill Village Historic District.

The Olympia Mill is within the Columbia city limits, just north of the CDP.

Demographics

2020 census

Note: the US Census treats Hispanic/Latino as an ethnic category. This table excludes Latinos from the racial categories and assigns them to a separate category. Hispanics/Latinos can be of any race.

References 

Census-designated places in Richland County, South Carolina
Census-designated places in South Carolina